The 12th Massachusetts Regiment, also known as 18th Continental Regiment and Phinney's Regiment, was raised on April 23, 1775, under Colonel Edmund Phinney outside of Boston, Massachusetts. The regiment saw action at the Battle of Bunker Hill, Battle of Valcour Island, Battle of Saratoga and the Battle of Monmouth. The regiment was disbanded on January 1, 1781, at West Point, New York.

External links
Bibliography of the Continental Army in Massachusetts compiled by the United States Army Center of Military History
History of Colonel Edmund Phinney's Eighteenth continental regiment, twelve ...by Nathan Goold

12th Massachusetts Regiment